Cold Like War is the fifth studio album by American metalcore band We Came as Romans. It was released on October 20, 2017, and is their first album through SharpTone Records. This is the band's first album to feature new drummer David Puckett, who replaced longtime drummer Eric Choi, and their last with singer Kyle Pavone before his death in August 2018.

Videos
On September 29, 2016, We Came as Romans presented the first single taken from this album, called "Wasted Age". On September 11, 2017, it was released through SharpTone Records YouTube channel a video for "Cold Like War", followed 10 days later by "Lost in the Moment". On October 19, 2017, the day before the album came out, the music video for "Foreign Fire" was released.

Critical reception
Alternative Press considered Cold Like War like a "milestone for WCAR", considering that "they have expanded their range of sounds, emotions and songwriting capabilities without compromising their sincerity". Louder Sound said that We Came as Romans, during its first album through SharpTone Records, "strive to make an impression", creating a "never boring record".

Track listing

Personnel

We Came as Romans
 David Stephens – lead vocals
 Kyle Pavone – clean vocals, keyboards, piano, synthesizer
 Joshua Moore – lead guitar, backing vocals
 Lou Cotton – rhythm guitar
 Andy Glass – bass guitar, backing vocals
 David Puckett – drums, percussion

Guest musicians
 Eric Vanlerberghe (I Prevail) — Guest Vocals on "If There's Nothing to See"

Charts

References

2017 albums
We Came as Romans albums
SharpTone Records albums